Montoneros was an Argentine left-wing Peronist guerrilla organization, active throughout the 1970s and early 1980s. The name is an allusion to the 19th-century cavalry militias called Montoneras, who fought for the Federalist Party  during the Argentine Civil Wars.

After Juan Perón's return from 18 years of exile and the 1973 Ezeiza massacre, which marked the definitive split between left and right-wing Peronism, the president expelled the Montoneros from the Justicialist party in May 1974. The group was completely destroyed during the Dirty War.

Ideology
The Montoneros began as a self-described Christian, nationalist, and socialist group; but as time passed the socialist element eclipsed the Christian. The writer Pablo Giussani claims that the Montoneros maintained that democracies were a complex masquerade that concealed fascist governments and delayed class struggle. Their attacks sought to force the governments to give up such pretensions and operate openly as fascist governments, expecting that in such a scenario the people would then support the guerrillas. This doctrine did not work as intended: people despised the military dictatorships, but some did not see the guerrillas as the enemies of the dictatorships, but rather as a contributing cause to the government's repression. The projected class struggle never took place and the U.S.-backed military dictatorship repressed all dissent.

Although Juan Perón encouraged the actions of José López Rega, supported the right-wing unionists and denied preferential promotions to the Montoneros, they thought that his actions were simply a strategic masquerade. Some believed that Perón supported the Montoneros' projects. Perón expelled the group from Plaza de Mayo and outlined the government's counter-insurgency that decimated the guerrillas. Some surviving Montoneros still acknowledge Perón as their leader. Shortly after his return to Argentina, however, Peron moved to the Right and insulted all leftists, prompting the Montoneros to go underground.

From 1970 to Videla's military dictatorship 
The Montoneros formed around 1970 out of a confluence of Roman Catholic groups, university students in social sciences, and leftist supporters of Juan Perón. "The Montoneros took their name from the pejorative term used by the 19th-century elite to discredit the mounted followers of the popular caudillos." Montonera referred to the raiding parties composed by Native Americans in Argentina, and the spear in the Montoneros seal refers to this inspiration.

The Montoneros initiated a campaign to destabilise by force the regime supported by the U.S., which had trained Argentinian and other Latin American dictators via the School of the Americas.

In 1970, as retribution for the June 1956 León Suárez massacre and Juan José Valle's execution, the Montoneros kidnapped and executed former dictator Pedro Eugenio Aramburu (1955–1958) and other collaborators. In November 1971, in solidarity with militant car workers, Montoneros took over a car manufacturing plant in Caseros, sprayed 38 Fiats with petrol, and set them afire.

On 26 July 1972, they set off explosives in the Plaza de San Isidro in Buenos Aires, which injured three policemen and killed one fireman (Carlos Adrián Ayala), who died of wounds two days later.
That same day, a policeman (Agent Ramón González) is shot dead after intercepting a vehicle when the two male and two female MPM guerrillas inside draw their guns and open fire on the police vehicle.

In April 1973, Colonel Héctor Irabarren, head of the 3rd Army Corps' Intelligence Service, was killed when resisting a kidnap attempt by the Mariano Pojadas and Susana Lesgart platoons of the Montoneros.

On 17 October 1972, a powerful bomb detonated inside the Sheraton Hotel in Buenos Aires, to the horror of nearly 700 guests, killing a Canadian woman (Lois Crozier, travel agent from West Vancouver) and gravely wounding her husband Gerry as he slept. The Montoneros and the Revolutionary Armed Forces later claimed responsibility for the attack.

On 11 March 1973, Argentina held general elections for the first time in ten years. Perón loyalist Héctor Cámpora became president and Perón returned from Spain. In a controversial move, he released all left-wing guerrillas held captive at the time in Argentina.

1974 
On 21 February 1974, the Montoneros killed Teodoro Ponce, a right-wing Peronist labour leader in Rosario. He had sought refuge in a local business after being shot at while driving by a carload of masked gunmen. One of the gunmen who got out of the car shot him dead while he lay on the floor and also shot a woman, who screamed out, "Murderer."

In May 1974, Perón expelled the Montoneros from the Justicialist movement. The Montoneros waited until after the death of Perón in July 1974 to react.  They claimed to have the "social revolutionary vision of authentic Peronism" and started guerrilla operations against the government. The more radically orthodoxy peronist and tright-wing factions quickly took control of the government; Isabel Perón, president since Juan Perón's death, was essentially a figurehead under the influence of López Rega.

On 15 July 1974, Montoneros assassinated Arturo Mor Roig, a former foreign minister. On 17 July, they murdered David Kraiselburd, journalist and editor-in-chief of El Día newspaper, in the Manuel B. Gonnet suburb of Buenos Aires after an exchange of fire with police.

In September, in order to finance their operations, they kidnapped the two brothers of the Bunge and Born family business. Some 20 urban guerrillas dressed as policemen shot dead a bodyguard and chauffeur and diverted traffic in this well-orchestrated ambush. Some 30 militants and sympathisers among the civilian population provided safe houses to the guerrillas and a means to escape. They demanded and received a ransom of $60 million in cash, as well as $1.2 million worth of food and clothing to be given to the poor.

Under López Rega's orders, the Triple A began kidnapping, and killing members of Montoneros and the People's Revolutionary Army (ERP), as well as other leftist militant groups. They expanded their attacks to anyone considered a leftist subversive or sympathiser, such as these groups' deputies or lawyers.

The Montoneros and the ERP in turn attacked business and political figures throughout Argentina, and raided military bases for weapons and explosives. The Montoneros killed executives from General Motors, Ford, and Chrysler. On 16 September 1974, about 40 Montoneros bombs exploded throughout Argentina. They targeted both foreign companies and commemorative ceremonies of the Revolucion Libertadora, the military revolt that had ended Juan Perón's first term as president on 16 September 1955. Targets included three Ford showrooms; Peugeot and IKA-Renault showrooms; Goodyear and Firestone tyre distributors, the pharmaceutical manufacturers Riker and Eli Lilly, the Union Carbide Battery Company, the Bank of Boston, Chase Manhattan Bank, the Xerox Corporation, and the soft drink companies, Coca-Cola and Pepsi-Cola. The Peronist guerrillas also held up at gunpoint two trains in a Buenos Aires suburb on 16 September. The Montoneros discouraged foreign investment more directly by blowing up the homes of company executives. For example, in 1975 the homes of five executives of Lazar Laboratories were bombed in the suburb of La Plata in Buenos Aires. The violence was widespread.

1975 
On 7 February, four carloads of Montoneros intercepted the car driven by Antonio Muscat, a manager of the Bunge y Born firm, and shot him dead in the presence of his daughter. On 14 February 1975, Montoneros killed Hipólito Acuña, a politician, as he parked his car outside his home in the city of Santa Fe.
On 18 February, Montoneros gunmen killed Félix Villafañe of the FITAM S.A. workers union, in the presence of his wife in the suburb of San Isidro in Buenos Aires. On 22 February 1975, in an ambush in the Lomas de Zamora suburb of Buenos Aires, three policemen (First Sergeant Nicolás Cardozo, Corporal Roberto Roque Fredes and Constables Eugenio Rodriguez and Abel Pascuzzi) were killed after their patrol car came under fire from Montoneros guerrillas. On 26 February 1975, the Montoneros kidnapped 62-year-old John Patrick Egan, a U.S. consular agent in the city of Córdoba, executing him two days later. That same day, they killed three policemen in another ambush by urban guerrillas in Buenos Aires, and an army conscript in Tucumán province was reported to have been killed in action. On 5 March 1975, a Montoneros bomb detonated in the underground parking at Plaza Colón of the Argentine Army High Command; a garbage truck driver (Alberto Blas García) was killed and 28 others were wounded, including four colonels and 18 other ranks. In early June 1975, Montoneros guerrillas murdered executives David Bargut and Raul Amelong of the Acindar steel firm in Rosario, in reprisal for alleged repression against striking employees. On 10 June 1975, guerrillas in Santa Fe shot and killed Juan Enrique Pelayes, a trade union leader. On 12 June 1975, in an ambush in the capital of the Córdoba province, three policemen (Pedro Ramón Enrico, Carlos Alberto Galíndez and corporal Luis Francisco Rodríguez) were killed by guerrillas. On 25 July 1975 four policemen were wounded in guerrilla attacks using bazookas and firebombs. On 26 August 1975, 26-year-old Fernando Haymal was killed by fellow Montoneros for allegedly cooperating with government forces.

The Montoneros' leadership was keen to learn from the ERP's Compañía de Monte Ramón Rosa Jiménez operating in the province of Tucumán. In 1975 they sent "observers" to spend a few months with the ERP platoons operating against the 5th Infantry Brigade, then consisting of the 19th, 20th and 29th Mountain Infantry Regiments. On 28 August 1975 the Montoneros planted a bomb in a culvert at the Tucumán air base airstrip. The blast destroyed an air force C-130 transport carrying 116 anti-guerrilla commandos of the Gendarmerie, killing five and wounding 40, one of whom later died of his injuries.

The network of Montoneros militants had been largely uprooted by the government in the capital of Tucumán province. In August 1975, several hundred Montoneros militants took to the streets in Córdoba, to divert attention from the military operations being waged in the mountains of Tucumán. They shot and killed five policemen (Sergeant Juan Carlos Román, Corporal Rosario del Carmen Moyano and Agents Luis Rodolfo López, Jorge Natividad Luna and Juan Antonio Diaz) after attacking their headquarters and bombed the police radio communications centre. As a result, the elite 4th Airborne Infantry Brigade, which had been ordered to assist operations in Tucumán province, was kept in Córdoba for the rest of the year.

On 5 October 1975, the Montoneros carried out a complex operation against a regiment of the 5th Brigade. During this attack named Operation Primicia ("Operation Scoop") a Montoneros force numbering an estimated several hundred guerrillas and underground supporters, set in motion an assault on an army barracks in Formosa province. On 5 October 1975, Montoneros members hijacked a civilian airliner bound for Corrientes from Buenos Aires. The guerrillas redirected the plane to Formosa, and took over the provincial airport, killing policeman Neri Argentino Alegre in the process. With tactical support from a local militant group, the invaders attacked the barracks of the 29th Infantry Regiment with gunfire and hand grenades. They shot several soldiers who had been resting in their quarters.

After the soldiers and NCOs got over their initial surprise, they mounted stiff resistance to the attacking Montoneros. In total, a second lieutenant (Ricardo Massaferro), sergeant (Víctor Sanabria) and ten conscripts (Antonio Arrieta, Heriberto Avalos, José Coronel, Dante Salvatierra, Ismael Sánchez, Tomás Sánchez, Edmundo Roberto Sosa, Marcelino Torales, Alberto Villalba and Hermindo Luna) were killed and several wounded. The Montoneros lost 16 killed in total. Two policemen later died of their wounds. The Montoneros escaped by air into a remote area in adjoining Santa Fe Province. The aircraft, a Boeing 737, landed in a crop field not far from the city of Rafaela. The Peronist guerrillas fled to waiting cars on a highway nearby.

The sophistication of the operation, and the getaway cars and hideouts they used to escape the military crackdown, suggest the involvement of several hundred guerrillas and civilian sympathisers in Montoneros' organisation. Under the presidency of Nestor Kirchner, the families of all the Montoneros killed in the attack were each later compensated with the payment of around US$200,000.

On 26 October 1975, a Catholic youth leader, Juan Ignacio Isla Casares, with the help of the Montoneros commander Eduardo Pereira Rossi (nom de guerre "El Carlón") was the mastermind behind the ambush and killing of five policemen (Pedro Dettle, Juan Ramón Costa, Carlos Livio Cejas, Cleofás Galeano, and Juan Fernández) near San Isidro Cathedral.

During February 1976, the Montoneros sent assistance to the hard-pressed Compañía de Monte Ramón Rosa Jiménez fighting in Tucumán province, in the form of a company of their elite "Jungle Troops", while the ERP backed them up with a company of their guerrillas from Cordoba. The Baltimore Sun reported at the time, "In the jungle-covered mountains of Tucuman, long known as "Argentina's garden," Argentines are fighting Argentines in a Vietnam-style civil war. So far, the outcome is in doubt. But there is no doubt about the seriousness of the combat, which involves 2,000 or so leftist guerrillas and perhaps as many as 10,000 soldiers."

While the ERP fought the army in Tucumán, the Montoneros were active in Buenos Aires. Montoneros' leadership dismissed the tactics of the ERP in Tucumán as "old fashioned" and "inappropriate" but still sent reinforcements. On 26 October 1975, five policemen (Pedro Dettle, Juan Ramón Costa, Carlos Livio Cejas, Cleofás Galeano, and Juan Fernández) were killed in Buenos Aires when Montoneros guerrillas ambushed their patrol cars near the San Isidro Cathedral. Two of the captured policemen were reported to have been executed in this operation under the orders of the Montoneros commander Eduardo Pereyra Rossi (nom de guerre Carlon).

In December 1975, Montoneros raided an armaments factory in the capital's Munro neighbourhood, fleeing with 250 assault rifles and sub-machine guns. That same month, a Montoneros bomb exploded at the headquarters of the Argentine army in Buenos Aires, injuring at least six soldiers. By the end of 1975, a total of 137 army officers, NCOs and conscripts and policemen had been killed that year and approximately 3,000 wounded by left wing terrorism. U.S. journalist Paul Hoeffel in an article written for the Boston Globe concluded that, "Although there is widespread reluctance to use the term, it is now impossible to ignore the fact that civil war has broken out in Argentina."

Seaborne attacks 
Montoneros were inspired by the British and Italian wartime commando raids on warships, and on 1 November 1974, Montoneros successfully blew up General Commissioner Alberto Villar, the chief of the Argentine federal police in his yacht. His wife was also killed on the spot. On 24 August 1975, their frogmen planted a mine on the river's bed below the hull of a navy destroyer, the ARA Santísima Trinidad, as she remained docked at Rio Santiago before her commissioning. The explosion caused considerable damage to the ship's computer and electronic equipment. On 14 December 1975, using the same techniques, Montoneros frogmen placed explosives on the yacht Itati in an attempt to kill the Commander-in-Chief of the Argentine navy, Admiral Emilio Massera. While Massera was not injured, the yacht was badly damaged by the explosives.

1976 
In January 1976, the son of retired Lieutenant-General Julio Alsogoray, Juan Alsogaray (El Hippie), copied from his father's safe a draft of "Battle Order 24 March" and passed it to the head of the Montoneros intelligence, Rodolfo Walsh, who informed the guerrilla leadership of the planned military coup. Private Sergio Tarnopolsky, serving in the Argentine Marine Corps in 1976, also passed on valuable information to Walsh regarding the tortures and killings of left-wing guerrillas taking place in ESMA. He was later that year made to disappear along with his father Hugo and mother Blanca and sister Betina in revenge for a bomb that he planted in the detention centre which failed to explode. The only survivor of the sequestration was his brother Daniel, who was not at home the day of the raid. On 26 January, ERP guerrillas supporting Montoneros operations in the suburb of Barracas in Buenos Aires, killed a female police traffic officer (Silvia Ester Rosboch de Campana). On 29 January, during a raid on the Bendix factory in the suburb of Munro in Buenos Aires, Montoneros shot and killed Alberto Olabarrieta and Jorge Sarlenga of the factory's management, and an off-duty policeman, Juan Carlos Garavaglio, who had tried to intervene.

On 2 February 1976, about fifty Montoneros attacked the Juan Vucetich Police Academy in the suburb of La Plata but were repelled when the police cadets fought back and reinforcements arrived. On 13 February, the Argentine army scored a major success when the 14th Airborne Infantry Regiment of the 4th Airborne Infantry Brigade ambushed the 65-strong Montoneros Jungle Company, in an action near the town of Cadillal in Tucumán province. The 2nd Airborne Infantry Regiment of the same brigade, was also released from garrison duties in the city of Córdoba after the ERP armed uprising that killed 5 policemen there in August 1975 and would achieve similar success against the ERP's Decididos de Córdoba company sent to rekindle the insurgency in Tucumán province. In the week preceding the military coup, the Montoneros killed 13 policemen as part of their Third National Military Campaign and vowed to kill at least 3,000 policemen by the decade's end.

The ERP guerrillas and their supporting network of militants came under heavy attack in April 1976, and the Montoneros were forced to come to their assistance with money, weapons and safe houses. On 21 June, the labour relations manager of Swift (an American food processing company), Osvaldo Raúl Trinidad was shot and killed outside his home in the La Plata suburb of Buenos Aires after coming under fire from a carload of masked Peronist guerrillas. On 1 July, a carload of Montoneros shot and killed Army Sergeant Raul Godofredo Favale in the Ramos Mejía suburb of Buenos Aires. On the following day the Montoneros detonated a powerful bomb in the Argentine Federal Police building in Buenos Aires, killing 24 and injuring 66 people. On 10 July 1976, policemen surrounded and entered a printing house in the San Andrés suburb of Buenos Aires in an attempt to free Vicecomodore Roberto Echegoyen from the Argentine air force, but the alerted guerrillas shot their hostage in the head. On 19 July, Montoneros killed Brigadier-General Carlos Omar Actis (tasked with overseeing the World Cup soccer championships in Argentina in 1978) in the suburb of Wilde in Buenos Aires. On 26 July, Montoneros guerrillas operating in the San Justo suburb of Buenos Aires shot and killed an off-duty policeman, Ramón Emilio Reno in the presence of his 13-year-old brother. An Argentine army 1976 report entitled Informe Especial: Actividades OPM "Montoneros" año 1976, gave the following surviving Montoneros totals for September 1976: 9,191 members with 991 guerrillas (391 officers and 600 other ranks), 2,700 armed militants and 5,500 sympathisers and active collaborators.

On 19 August 1976, Carlos Bergometti of the senior management of Fiat in Córdoba, was intercepted on his way to work and killed by Montoneros armed with shotguns in a car. On 2 September, the urban guerrillas killed Lieutenant-Colonel Carlos Heriberto Astudillo in the suburb of Escobar in Buenos Aires. On 7 September, Daniel Andrés Cash of the Banco de la Nación Argentina was killed on his way to work by a Montoneros guerrilla armed with a shotgun. On 12 September 1976, a Montoneros car bomb destroyed a bus carrying police officers in Rosario, killing nine policemen and a married couple, 56-year-old Oscar Walter Ledesma and 42-year-old Irene Ángela Dib. There were at least 50 wounded. On 17 October a Montoneros bomb blast in an Army Club cinema in downtown Buenos Aires killed 11 and wounded about 50 officers and their families. On 9 November, eleven police officers were wounded when a Montoneros bomb exploded at the police headquarters at La Plata during a meeting of the Buenos Aires police chiefs.

On 16 November 1976, about 40 Montoneros guerrillas stormed the police station at Arana, 30 miles south of Buenos Aires. Five policemen and one army captain were wounded in the battle. On 15 December, another Montoneros bomb planted in a Defence Ministry movie hall killed at least 14 and injured 30 officers and their families. On 29 December, Montoneros shot and killed Colonel Francisco Castellanos and wounded his driver, Private Alberto Gutiérrez, just a few blocks from the army officer's home in the suburb of Florida in Buenos Aires. The worst year of the insurgency, 1976, saw 156 army officers, NCOs, and conscripts, and police killed.

By the time Videla's military junta took power in March 1976, approximately five thousand prisoners were being held in various prisons around Argentina, some with connections and some just guilty by association. In all, 12,000 Argentines were detained during the military dictatorship and became known as the detenidos-desaparecidos, but survived after international pressure forced the military authorities to release them. These prisoners were held throughout the years of the dictatorship, many of them never receiving trials, in prisons such as La Plata, Devoto, Rawson, and Caseros. Justice Minister Ricardo Gil Lavedra, who formed part of the 1985 tribunal judging the military crimes committed during the Dirty War would later go on record saying that "I sincerely believe that the majority of the victims of the illegal repression were guerrilla militants".

Terence Roehrig, in The prosecution of former military leaders in newly democratic nations: the cases of Argentina, Greece, and South Korea  (Pg 42, McFarland & Company, 2001), estimates that of the disappeared in Argentina "at least 10,000 were involved in various ways with the guerrillas". The Montoneros later admitted losing 5,000 guerrillas killed, and the People's Revolutionary Army (Ejército Revolucionario del Pueblo or ERP) admitted the loss of another 5,000 of their own combatants killed. Some 11,000 Argentines have applied for and received up to US$200,000 each as monetary compensation for the loss of loved ones during the military dictatorship. In late November 2012, it was reported that the government of Cristina Fernández de Kirchner would approve monetary compensation for the families that lost loved ones in the Montoneros attack on the 29th Regiment barracks on 5 October 1975, the first of its kind for military families in Argentina.

Under Jorge Videla's junta
On 24 March 1976, Isabel Perón was ousted and a military junta installed, led by General Jorge Rafael Videla. On 4 April 1976, Montoneros assassinated a naval commander (Jose Guillermo Burgos) and a Chrysler executive (Jorge Ricardo Kenny) and ambushed and killed three policemen in a patrol car. On 26 April 1976, Montoneros guerrillas killed Colonel Abel Héctor Elías Cavagnaro outside his home in Tucumán province. On 27 June 1976, Montoneros guerrillas operating in the city of Rosario ambushed and destroyed two police cars, killing three police officers During the first few months of the military government, more than 70 policemen were killed in leftist guerrilla attacks. On 11 August 1976, urban guerrillas dressed like police officers intercepted and killed army corporal Jorge Antonio Bulacio, with two shots to the head and set fire to his military lorry belonging to the 141st Headquarters Communications Battalion with a Molotov cocktail bomb.

On 4 January 1977, a female guerrilla (Ana María González) from the Montoneros movement shot and killed Private Guillermo Félix Dimitri of the 10th Mechanized Infantry Brigade while he was on roadblock duty outside the Chrysler factory in the San Justo suburb of Buenos Aires.
 On 27 January, a Montoneros bomb explodes outside a police station in the city of Rosario in Santa Fe Province, killing a policeman (Miguel Angel Bracamonte) and a 15-year-old girl (María Leonor Berardi), an innocent bystander. On 28 January, a female Montoneros guerrilla (22-year-old Juana Silvia Charura) placed a bomb inside the 2nd Police Station in the suburb of Cuidadela, destroying the building and killing three policemen: Commissioner Carlos A. Benítez, Sub-Commissioner Lorenzo Bonnani and Agent César Landeria.

On 10 February, two police officers (Roque Alipio Farías and Ernesto Olivera) with an anti-explosives unit were fatally wounded trying to deactivate a bomb rigged to a motorbike in Rosario. On 15 February 1977, army corporal Osvaldo Ramón Ríos was killed after his patrol came under fire from a group of Montoneros that had barricaded themselves inside a house in the Ezpeleta suburb of Buenos Aires. That same month, Ireneo Garnica and Alejandro Díaz, both railway workers who had refused to participate in a strike, were killed when Montoneros threw a bomb at them in the suburb of Quilmes in Buenos Aires. On 19 March 1977, 45-year-old Sergeant Martín A. Novau from the Federal Police was shot and killed while he was repairing a police car in a work shop in Buenos Aires.

On 23 May 1977, the leftist guerrillas in Buenos Aires killed two police officers and a retired inspector as he entered his home.

The junta redoubled the Dirty War anti-guerrilla campaign. During 1977, in just Buenos Aires alone, 36 police were reported killed in actions involving the remaining urban guerrillas

On 1 August 1978, a powerful bomb meant to kill Rear Admiral Armando Lambruschini (chairman of the Joint Chiefs) ripped through a nine-story apartment building, killing three civilians and trapping scores beneath the debris.

On 14 August 1977, Susana Leonor Siver and her partner Marcelo Carlos Reinhold, both Montoneros fighters, were kidnapped from Reinold's mother's home along with a friend by a fifteen-strong naval intelligence team and taken to the ESMA naval detention camp. After a brutal torture session in front of his wife, Marcelo was supposedly "transferred" to another camp but nothing was heard of him since. In February 1978, Susana was disappeared by the military authorities soon after giving birth to a blonde girl.

Adriana and Gaspar Tasca, both identified as Montoneros, were taken into custody between 7 and 10 December 1977 and remain unaccounted for. On 6 October 1978, José Pérez Rojo and Patricia Roisinblit, both Montoneros members, were made to disappear. According to different sources, 8,000 to 30,000 people are estimated to have disappeared and died during the military dictatorship that ruled Argentina from 1976 to 1983. Some 12,000 of the missing known as the detenidos-desaparecidos, survived detention and were later compensated for their ordeal. On the other hand, according to an NGO dedicated to defending "victims of terrorism", 1,355 people, including members of the police and military, were killed by Montoneros and other left-wing armed movements.

The commander of the Montoneros, Mario Firmenich, in a radio interview in late 2000 from Spain later stated that "In a country that has experienced a civil war, everybody has blood on their hands." The junta relied on mass illegal arrests, torture, and executions without trial to stifle any political opposition. Some victims were thrown from transport planes into the Atlantic Ocean on what have become infamously known as death flights. Others had their corpses left on streets as intimidation of others. The Montoneros admit 5,000 of their guerrillas were killed.

The Montoneros were effectively finished off by 1977, although their "Special Forces" did fight on until 1981. The Montoneros tried to disrupt the World Cup Football Tournament being hosted in Argentina in 1978 by launching a number of bomb attacks. In late 1979, the Montoneros launched a "strategic counteroffensive" in Argentina, and the security forces killed more than one hundred of the exiled Montoneros, who had been sent back to Argentina after receiving special forces training in camps in the Middle East. On 14 June 1980, eight Argentine army officers (in cooperation with Peruvian military authorities), kidnapped Noemí Esther Giannetti de Molfino (an active Montoneros collaborator) along with eight Argentine nationals in the Peruvian capital and had them forcefully disappear. In October 2014, the presidency of Cristina Fernández de Kirchner would rename a street in the city of Resistencia, Chaco Province in her memory. Her daughter Marcela along with her partner, Guillermo Amarilla, had both disappeared in 1979 while re-entering Argentina as part of the Montoneros "strategic counteroffensive".

Among the Montoneros killed in this operation were Luis Francisco Goya and María Lourdes Martínez Aranda who after crossing the Chilean border into Argentina were abducted in the city of Mendoza in 1980 and never seen again, with their son Jorge Guillermo being adopted and raised by an army NCO, Luis Alberto Tejada and his wife Raquel Quinteros. During the 1980s a captured Sandinista commando revealed that Montoneros "Special Forces" were training Sandinista frogmen and conducting gun runs across the Gulf of Fonseca to the Sandinista allies in El Salvador, FMLN guerrillas.

During the Falklands War against Great Britain, the Argentine military conceived the aborted Operation Algeciras, a covert plan to support and convince some Commando-trained Montoneros, by appealing to their patriotism, to sabotage British military facilities in Gibraltar. Argentina's defeat led to the fall of the junta, and Raúl Alfonsín became president in December 1983, thus initiating the democratic transition.

Members

 Esther Norma Arrostito
 Dardo Cabo
 Nilda Garré
 Juan Gelman
 Carlos Kunkel
 Hector G. Oesterheld
 Jorge Taiana
 Francisco Urondo
 Horacio Verbitsky
 Rodolfo Walsh

See also

 Peronist Armed Forces

References

Books
 Brown, Jonathan C. 2010. A brief history of Argentina. 2nd edition. Facts on File, Inc.
 Soldiers of Perón: Argentina's Montoneros, by Richard Gillespie (1982).
 
 Argentina, 1943–1987: The National Revolution and Resistance, by Donald C. Hodges (1988).*Guerrillas and Generals: The Dirty War in Argentina, by Paul H. Lewis (2001).
 Guerrilla politics in Argentina, by Kenneth F. Johnson (1975).
 Argentina's Lost Patrol: Armed Struggle 1969–1979 by María José Moyano (1995).
 Guerrilla warfare in Argentina and Colombia, 1974–1982, by Bynum E. Weathers, Jr. (1982).

Montoneros
Guerrilla organizations
Far-left politics
Operation Condor
History of Argentina (1955–1973)
History of Argentina (1973–1976)
Peronism
Defunct organizations designated as terrorist
Organizations designated as terrorist by Argentina